Ivan Ivanovich Shamshev (May 4, 1819 – April 21, 1892) was an Imperial Russian lieutenant general, adjutant general and division commander. He fought in the Caucasus, Hungary, Crimea, Poland and against the Ottoman Empire.

Awards
Order of Saint Vladimir, 3rd class, 1863
Order of Saint Stanislaus (House of Romanov), 1st class, 1865
Order of Saint Anna, 1st class, 1867
Order of Saint Vladimir, 2nd class, 1871
Order of the White Eagle (Russian Empire), 1878
Gold Sword for Bravery, 1879

Sources
 Русский биографический словарь: В 25 т. / под наблюдением А. А. Половцова. 1896–1918.
 Список генералам по старшинству. Составлен по 1 сентября 1891 г. — СПб., 1891. — С. 58. 
 Шамшев И.И. Рассказы старого лейб-казака // Русская старина, 1876. - Т. 17. - № 12. - С. 834-842.

1819 births
1892 deaths
People of the Caucasian War
Russian military personnel of the Crimean War
Russian military personnel of the Russo-Turkish War (1877–1878)
Russian people of the January Uprising
Recipients of the Order of St. Vladimir, 3rd class
Recipients of the Order of Saint Stanislaus (Russian), 1st class
Recipients of the Order of St. Anna, 1st class
Recipients of the Order of St. Vladimir, 2nd class
Recipients of the Order of the White Eagle (Russia)
Recipients of the Gold Sword for Bravery